The 2019 Conference USA Football Championship Game was a college football game played on Saturday, December 7, 2019, at FAU Stadium in Boca Raton, Florida, to determine the 2019 champion of Conference USA (C–USA). The game featured the East division champions Florida Atlantic and the West division champions UAB and was the conference's 15th championship game. With sponsorship from Ryan LLC, a global tax services and software provider, the game was officially the 2019 Ryan Conference USA Football Championship Game.

Previous season
The 2018 Conference USA Football Championship Game featured East Division champion Middle Tennessee against West Division champion UAB in a rematch of the regular season match up a week before. Unlike the week prior, UAB was able to get a final field goal to take the lead, towards the end of the 4th quarter in a win of 27–25.

Teams
The 2019 CUSA Football Championship Game was contested by the Florida Atlantic Owls, East Division champions, and the UAB Blazers, West Division co–champions. The teams have met eight times previously, with Florida Atlantic holding a 6–2 edge in the series. The teams' last meeting came in 2014; UAB won, 31–28. Florida Atlantic's last victory in the series came in 2013, when they defeated UAB 37–3
. This will be the teams' first meeting in the CUSA Football Championship.

Florida Atlantic
Florida Atlantic clinched its spot in the Championship Game after its November 30 win over Southern Miss. This is Florida Atlantic's second overall appearance in the Championship Game in three seasons. The Owls were previously 1–0 overall in the game, with their sole win back in 2017 against North Texas.

UAB 
UAB earned its spot after clinching the West Division title on November 30 with a win over North Texas. This will be UAB's second appearance in the title game, when they defeated Middle Tennessee last season, 27–25. The Blazers are the first team to represent the West Division twice consecutively since former CUSA member, Tulsa, did back in 2008. Eight different teams had represented the division each year since then. UAB was previously 1–0 overall in the game, with their sole win last season against Middle Tennessee.

Game summary

Statistics

See also
List of Conference USA football champions

References

Championship
Conference USA Football Championship Game
Florida Atlantic Owls football games
UAB Blazers football games
December 2019 sports events in the United States
Conference USA Football Championship